Pizza Lab is a non-profit vegan restaurant in Leipzig that was founded in 2016. It is entirely ran by a team of volunteers from all over the world and the surplus is donated to local charities that focus on sustainability, environmental protection, animal warfare, and good neighborliness.

Customers are estimulated to experiment with a selection of toppings listed on a menu inspired on the periodic table.

Events
Because Pizza Lab is not profit-oriented, the events organized in it's venue are more similar to a community space than a business, such as tattoo parties, nude drawing classes, yoga, open-mic, diary slams, haircutting meetings, DIY workshops, readings, life drawing, pillow fights, science lectures, LEGO parties, and meeting location for non-profit projects. The location features a small stage where artists regularly play.

History
The location in which Pizza Lab operates used to be a meat distribution centre, according to a permit issued in 1939.

Crowdfunding campaign in 2019
A crowdfunding campaing was started in August 2019 to raise 20,000 Euros in order to comply with local regulations by building a fire protection ceiling, fire protection door, and expanded escape routes.

Two months later, the campaign was declared a success with more than 22,000 Euros collected in donations from more than 500 supporters, including companies, politicians, neighbours, friends, and sympathisers.

References 

pt:Pizza Lab

Pizzerias
Restaurants in Germany